
Starogard County is a unit of territorial administration and local government (powiat) in Pomeranian Voivodeship, northern Poland. The name is a combination of two terms: stari which is Slavic for old and gard which is Pomeranian language stands for town, city, fortified settlement. In this meaning, the term gard (also spelled as gôrd) is still being used in the only surviving dialect of the Pomeranian, Kashubian language. The county came into being on January 1, 1999, as a result of the Polish local government reforms passed in 1998. Starogard County is part of the area traditionally inhabited by the Kociewiacy ethnic group.

As of 2019 its total population is 127,676, out of which the population of Starogard Gdański is 47,775, that of Skarszewy is 6,994, that of Skórcz is 3,625, that of Czarna Woda is 2,786, and the rural population is 66,496.

Starogard County on a map of the counties of Pomeranian Voivodeship

Starogard County is bordered by Gdańsk County to the north, Tczew County to the east, Świecie County to the south, Tuchola County to the south-west, and Chojnice County and Kościerzyna County to the west.

Administrative division
The county is subdivided into 13 gminas (three urban, one urban-rural and nine rural). These are listed in the following table, in descending order of population.

References

 
Starogard